Waikeria is a rural community in the Otorohanga District and Waikato region of New Zealand's North Island.

Waikeria Prison, one of New Zealand's largest prisons, is located on a  site on Waikeria Road.

The local Whakamārama Marae is a meeting place of the Ngāti Raukawa hapū of Ngāti Puehutore. It includes Te Rangimoeakau meeting house.

Demographics
Waikeria settlement and the prison are in two SA1 statistical areas which cover . The SA1 areas are part of the larger Punui statistical area.

The SA1 areas had a population of 534 at the 2018 New Zealand census, an increase of 60 people (12.7%) since the 2013 census, and a decrease of 174 people (−24.6%) since the 2006 census. There were 84 households, comprising 435 males and 96 females, giving a sex ratio of 4.53 males per female, with 48 people (9.0%) aged under 15 years, 165 (30.9%) aged 15 to 29, 294 (55.1%) aged 30 to 64, and 21 (3.9%) aged 65 or older.

Ethnicities were 55.6% European/Pākehā, 47.2% Māori, 5.6% Pacific peoples, 2.8% Asian, and 1.1% other ethnicities. People may identify with more than one ethnicity.

Although some people chose not to answer the census's question about religious affiliation, 54.5% had no religion, 26.4% were Christian, 7.3% had Māori religious beliefs, 1.7% were Muslim, 0.6% were Buddhist and 5.1% had other religions.

Of those at least 15 years old, 30 (6.2%) people had a bachelor's or higher degree, and 72 (14.8%) people had no formal qualifications. 45 people (9.3%) earned over $70,000 compared to 17.2% nationally. The employment status of those at least 15 was that 183 (37.7%) people were employed full-time, 54 (11.1%) were part-time, and 24 (4.9%) were unemployed.

Puniu statistical area

Puniu had a population of 1,488 at the 2018 New Zealand census, an increase of 81 people (5.8%) since the 2013 census, and a decrease of 12 people (−0.8%) since the 2006 census. There were 408 households, comprising 933 males and 555 females, giving a sex ratio of 1.68 males per female. The median age was 33.4 years (compared with 37.4 years nationally), with 291 people (19.6%) aged under 15 years, 366 (24.6%) aged 15 to 29, 726 (48.8%) aged 30 to 64, and 108 (7.3%) aged 65 or older.

Ethnicities were 76.2% European/Pākehā, 27.4% Māori, 2.8% Pacific peoples, 4.2% Asian, and 1.6% other ethnicities. People may identify with more than one ethnicity.

The percentage of people born overseas was 10.9, compared with 27.1% nationally.

Although some people chose not to answer the census's question about religious affiliation, 58.7% had no religion, 27.0% were Christian, 2.6% had Māori religious beliefs, 0.8% were Hindu, 0.6% were Muslim, 0.4% were Buddhist and 3.6% had other religions.

Of those at least 15 years old, 135 (11.3%) people had a bachelor's or higher degree, and 225 (18.8%) people had no formal qualifications. The median income was $28,300, compared with $31,800 nationally. 165 people (13.8%) earned over $70,000 compared to 17.2% nationally. The employment status of those at least 15 was that 642 (53.6%) people were employed full-time, 171 (14.3%) were part-time, and 42 (3.5%) were unemployed.

Education

Korakonui School is a Year 1–8 co-educational state primary school.

References

Ōtorohanga District
Populated places in Waikato